"Point It Out"  is a 1969 recording by Motown Records R&B group The Miracles (AKA "Smokey Robinson & The Miracles") on that label's Tamla subsidiary (Tamla 54189). This mid-tempo song was a national Billboard Top 40 Pop hit, reaching #37 on the Hot 100, and was a Top 10 R&B hit was well, reaching #4. It was taken from their album "A Pocket Full Of Miracles", and was written by Miracles members William "Smokey" Robinson and Marv Tarplin, along with Motown staff songwriter Al Cleveland.

Background
Robinson and Cleveland were the song's producers. It was recorded by the group on September 18, 1969. "Point It Out" has inspired a cover version by The Supremes and The Temptations. As with many Miracles hit tunes, "Point It Out" begins with Miracles member/co-composer Marv Tarplin's guitar, while Robinson, as the song's narrator, explains the sheer joy of being in a new love relationship with a special lady, one so special that he simply can't think of a reason for not loving her:

"You're the one that I'm crazy for
And, every day it seems I love you more and more
Now, if there's a reason why I shouldn't love you
The way that I do, with a love that is true
Somebody Point It Out...
Point It Out to me".

Unlike some Miracles songs, where the background vocalists' voices are partially obscured under the music, Miracles Bobby Rogers, Ronnie White, Pete Moore, and Claudette Rogers Robinson's voices are clearly audible in this song, giving it more of a "group" sound, their tight harmonies adding to the song's overall quality feel, while Robinson's trademark poetry and mastery with wordplay are clearly evident throughout. This song is the closest that The Miracles have come to pure Funk in any of their records.

The song's "B" side, Darling Dear, was also a hit, reaching #100 on the Billboard Pop chart that same year. It has inspired a cover version by The Jackson Five, who in their career, covered many Miracles tunes, including "Who's Lovin' You", "(Come 'Round Here) I'm the One You Need," and "The Love I Saw in You Was Just a Mirage". Both songs have appeared on several Miracles' "Greatest Hits" CD compilations, including their 35th Anniversary Collection box set.

Credits: The Miracles

William "Smokey" Robinson
Claudette Robinson
Warren "Pete" Moore
Bobby Rogers
Ronnie White
Marv Tarplin

Other Instruments
The Funk Brothers

Chart performance

References

External links
Smokey Robinson and The Miracles; The 35th Anniversary Collection Liner Notes, Pgs 58 & 62
 Point It Out by The Miracles-Allmusic Guide Song Review 
 

Motown singles
1969 songs
Songs written by Marv Tarplin
Songs written by Smokey Robinson
Songs written by Al Cleveland
The Miracles songs
Song recordings produced by Smokey Robinson